"Never Again" is a song by American rock band Breaking Benjamin, released on January 20, 2017 as the fifth single on the band's fifth studio album Dark Before Dawn. The song topped the Billboard Mainstream Rock Songs chart in 2017, the third song from the album to do so, behind "Failure" and "Angels Fall".

Background
The song was written during the sessions for Breaking Benjamin's 2015 album release Dark Before Dawn, which saw frontman Benjamin Burnley reforming the band after a multi-year hiatus with an entirely new lineup. While Burnley states that he ended up writing 95% percent of the album alone prior to recruiting the new band lineup, "Never Again" was one of the album's few collaborative songs, and the only song to feature input from all members of the new lineup. Newly recruited guitarist Jasen Rauch came in to help Burnley finish the track, writing the song's guitar riff himself, and collaborating on the song's bridge with Burnley.

The band first teased a release of a music video for the song on January 9, 2017, before officially releasing it on January 13, 2017. The music video involves a group of three friends who get addicted to a fictional drug that prevents aging. While initially enjoying the effects, it eventually leads them to turn on one another. In the end, all three eventually succumb to their fate and turn to dust dying peacefully, albeit two of them together, and the other (who killed the tree that they used to harvest the drug from which caused them to turn on each other) dying alone.

Composition and themes
The song was described as similar to some of the band's prior music, as a mix of heavy metal and hard rock, and having a "wonderful dynamic between softer melody driven choruses, the hard-edged crunch of Burnley's guitar and the dirty backing vocals."

Personnel
 Benjamin Burnley – lead vocals, rhythm guitar
 Jasen Rauch – lead guitar
 Keith Wallen – rhythm guitar, backing vocals
 Aaron Bruch – bass, backing vocals
 Shaun Foist – drums

Charts

References

Breaking Benjamin songs
2017 singles
2015 songs
Hollywood Records singles
Songs written by Benjamin Burnley
Songs written by Jasen Rauch
Songs written by Keith Wallen
American heavy metal songs